Alexander Grabovetskiy (born July 4, 1973) is a Russian-American Master wood carver.

Grabovetskiy was recognized as the 2012 International Wood Carver of the year, and his piece Wall Decoration was awarded first place. His work utilizes the same approaches used for centuries by master woodcarvers, including techniques employed by Grinling Gibbons.

In 2015 Alexander Grabovetskiy was Editors’ Choice to be Awarded with Woodworking Excellence in category: Turnings, Carvings & Objets d’Art by Popular Woodworking Magazine.

Biography
Grabovetskiy was born on July 4, 1973, in the Russian town of Dimitrovgrad. His grandfather taught him basic woodcarving techniques at six-years old, and at 16 he was taken on as an apprentice by renowned carver Vladimir Tokarev.

Due to his faith and his refusal to enlist in the Soviet Armed Forces, Grabovetskiy was imprisoned by the Soviet authorities. He was freed after two years as part of an Amnesty International campaign for prisoners of faith incarcerated by the USSR. In prison he began a business making furniture and kitchen sets, and finding no work upon his release at the age of 21 years, he continued on to run his own woodworking enterprise.

In 1996, Grabovetskiy immigrated as a political refugee to the United States together with his wife Nadia and their 10-month-old son. The woodworking and custom home building business that he established in Goshen, Indiana, Aalmark LLC, employed a number of expert craftsmen who were also Christian refugees from the former Soviet Union. He currently works in South Florida.

Teaching Wood Carving
Alexander teaches woodcarving online and woodcarving in person
Alexander Grabovetskiy covers, in detail, a different form for every class he teaches.  So he has a large following who take many of his classes because they learn something new each time while reinforcing the basics.  They have found that this is the best way to rapidly improve their carving ability.
Multiple Woodworking Schools offer his classes " carving in Person.

References

External links

1973 births
20th-century Russian sculptors
20th-century American male artists
21st-century Russian sculptors
Living people
American cabinetmakers
American Christian clergy
American evangelicals
American woodcarvers
People from Boca Raton, Florida
Artists from Charlotte, North Carolina
People from Goshen, Indiana
People from Dimitrovgrad, Russia
People from Union County, North Carolina
Amnesty International prisoners of conscience held by the Soviet Union
Refugees in the United States
Russian emigrants to the United States
Russian Christians
Russian engravers
Russian evangelicals
Russian refugees
Russian male sculptors
20th-century American printmakers
Soviet prisoners and detainees
20th-century Russian male artists
21st-century Russian male artists
20th-century engravers